Synnøve Karlsen is a Norwegian-British actress best known for playing Clarice Orsini in the historical drama series Medici, Holly McStay in the BBC thriller series Clique and Jocasta in the 2021 Edgar Wright psychological horror film Last Night in Soho.

Early life and education 
Karlsen was born in Glasgow, Scotland, and raised in Helensburgh before her family relocated to London when she was 12 years old. She is of Norwegian descent. She has three older brothers and is the niece of Elizabeth Karlsen and Stephen Woolley. She studied at the London Academy of Music and Dramatic Art and then the Guildhall School of Music and Drama, leaving after a year upon being cast in Clique.

Career

Television

Stage 
She has performed at the Edinburgh Fringe Festival.

Film

References

External links

Living people
1996 births
21st-century Scottish actresses
Actresses from Glasgow
Actresses from London
People from Helensburgh
Scottish people of Norwegian descent
Scottish stage actresses
Scottish television actresses
21st-century British actresses
British people of Norwegian descent
British television actresses
British stage actresses